The Changsha Municipal People's Government is the top-tier local government administrative body of the People's Republic of China that governs the prefecture-level city of Changsha, the capital of Hunan province.

Organization
Logistics and Port Office
General Office
Development and Reform Commission
Education Bureau
Science and Technology Bureau
Bureau of Industry and Information Technology
Ethnic and Religious Affairs Bureau
Public Security Bureau
Civil Affairs Bureau
Justice Bureau
Finance Bureau
Human Resources and Social Security Bureau
Bureau of Natural Resources and Planning
Ecological Environment Bureau
Bureau of Housing and Urban-Rural Development
Transportation Bureau
Water Conservation Bureau
Bureau of Rural and Agriculture Affairs
Commerce Bureau
Bureau of Culture, Tourism, Radio and Television
Health and Family Planning Commission
Auditing Bureau
Bureau of Veterans Affairs
Department of Emergency Management
State-owned Assets Supervision and Administration Commission
Forestry Bureau
Administration for Market Regulation
Sports Bureau
Statistics Bureau
Bureau of City Administration and Comprehensive Law Enforcement

Mayor

The Mayor of Changsha is the chief executive officer of the city. Under the mayor there are one executive vice mayor and seven vice-mayors.

Gallery

References

External links

Changsha